Tarık Langat Akdağ (born Patrick Kipkirui Langat on June 16, 1988, in Nandi, Kenya) is a Turkish long-distance runner of Kenyan origin competing in the 3000 m and 5000 m events.

He is qualified to participate in the 3000 m steeplechase event at the 2012 Summer Olympics, finishing in 9th. At the 2013 Mediterranean Games held in Mersin, Turkey, he won the silver medal in the 3000 m steeplechase event. He became gold medalist in the 3000 m steeplechase event at the 2013 Islamic Solidarity Games held in Palembang, Indonesia.  That year, he also competed at the World Championships.  He participated in the 3000 m steeplechase at the 2016 Olympics, but did not finish his heat. In 2017, he competed in the men's 3000 metres steeplechase at the 2017 World Athletics Championships held in London, United Kingdom.

Achievements

References

External links
 

1988 births
Living people
Kenyan male long-distance runners
Turkish male long-distance runners
Kenyan male steeplechase runners
Olympic athletes of Turkey
Turkish people of Kenyan descent
Naturalized citizens of Turkey
Kenyan emigrants to Turkey
People from Nandi County
Athletes (track and field) at the 2012 Summer Olympics
Athletes (track and field) at the 2016 Summer Olympics
European Athletics Championships medalists
Mediterranean Games silver medalists for Turkey
Athletes (track and field) at the 2013 Mediterranean Games
World Athletics Championships athletes for Turkey
Athletes (track and field) at the 2018 Mediterranean Games
Mediterranean Games medalists in athletics